Keolari  is a town and a tehsil in Seoni district in the state of Madhya Pradesh, India. The confluence of the Wainganga and Sagar rivers is located at Keolari. The town has a District Institute of Education Training. (D.I.E.T.).

Geography 
Keolari is named after a kind of paddy "keolar" which was profusely produced in this region. It has an average elevation of 447 metres (1466 feet). It is located at the absolute center of the country.

Demographics 
 India census, Keolari had a population of 8,840. Males constitute 4,495, 50.84% of the population and females 4,345, 49.15%. As per District government, Keolari has an average literacy rate of 69.16%, higher than the national average of 59.5%: male literacy is 79.82%, and female literacy is 58.47%. Schools in Keolari include Deep Jyoti Public Higher Secondary School, Bhartiya Gyan Peeth, Saraswati Shishu Mandir, Ramanujan Convent School, Excellence School (formerly Govt. Boys Hr. Sec. School), Gov. Girls Hr. Sec. School, St. Norbert's School and others.

Civic administration 
Keolari is a tehsil. It is administered by Keolari Nagar Parishad. The town is divided in 15 wards. Each ward is represented by a ward member or Parshad. The SDM court has been working since 1998. It is also a Janpad panchayat.

Climate 
The city has the typical hot and dry temperate of the Great Indian Plateau. Keolari is hot during summers with temperatures up to 44 degree Celsius but the winters are quite comfortable. From the July to September months bring heavy rains with the onset of the South Western monsoon. The October to March window during the winters is suitable for a visit to the city.

Transport

Rail 
Keolari is a railway station on the narrow gauge line between Jabalpur to the north and Gondia / Balaghat to the south. It is connected to Asia's largest narrow gauge railway station Nainpur. This line is scheduled for conversion to broad gauge.  Narrow gauge line also branches to Nainpur Mandla in the east and to Nagpur via Chhindwara.

 
All the route is suspended to Maga is blocked.

Air 
The nearest airports are at Jabalpur (135 km) and Nagpur (180 km).

Road 
It is connected to Mandla, Seoni, Nagpur, Jabalpur and Balaghat by roads. Between Mandla and Keolari is a small village "Chirai Dongri", from where there is access to Kanha Kislee, a well-known national park. There are picnic spots at Sangam, Siddhaghat, and other locations. It is known for its two Khermai (choti and badi). Siddhaghat has small marble rocks just like Bhedhaghat in Jabalpur. The river Wanganga cut through the rocks here.

Communication providers 
Airtel, Idea, Reliance Jio, vodafone and BSNL are the cellular service providers in Keolari.

References

External links
 https://web.archive.org/web/20090410043356/http://dietkeolari.nic.in/about.htm

Cities and towns in Seoni district
Seoni, Madhya Pradesh